Zinc finger protein 706 is a protein that in humans is encoded by the ZNF706 gene.

References

Further reading